Def Jam: Icon is a fighting video game, the third in Electronic Arts's Def Jam-licensed hip-hop video game series.  The game was developed by EA Chicago, the first Def Jam game not to be developed by AKI Corporation. Unlike the previous games in the series, the game's soundtrack is completely changeable. The game was released in March 2007 for the Xbox 360 and PlayStation 3.

Gameplay
Def Jam: Icon is less wrestling-oriented than the previous games, Def Jam Vendetta and Def Jam: Fight for NY. The game's executive producer, Kudo Tsunoda, has stated that he did not feel that wrestling and hip-hop went particularly well with each other. However, throws and environmental damage remain in the game.

Gameplay is similar to EA Chicago's Fight Night: Round 3, featuring a focus on up-close brawling, mixing up blocks, throws, parries, and using the right analog stick to deliver stronger attacks. Also, like Round 3, there is no in-game heads up display by default, encouraging the player to observe physical cues on in-game characters to determine their health, such as clothing, bruises and exhaustion of the opponent.

Developers aimed to make the music and the environment a much larger factor in the fight. Among the environments are streets, subways, nightclubs, penthouses, BET's 106 and Park stage, and others.

The game makes unique use of synesthesia-inspired mechanics for a fighting game, in which there is a level of interactivity between music and the stages where hazards and the entire backdrop moves to the beat of the BGM. Different events occur on the beats of each song - some of which are dangerous. For example, a column of fire shoots up from a ruined gas station on every "bass hit" of a song's chorus. Other changes will be purely cosmetic: hubcaps on cars will spin and twinkle to the beat of each song. The developers have added more damage to a fighter's punches and kicks if they occur "to the beat" or making a rapper stronger if one of their songs is playing.

By listening to the beat of the song and then timing a throw, the player can toss the opponent into an environmental hazard just as it goes off. The game features a "turntable" action, where by spinning the right analog stick allows the character to manipulate the music and the environment for both players and shows the character as if they are using a DJ turntable in mid-air. With this, the environment can be used for gaining advantage and weakening the opponents by activating the environmental hazards when they are near. During the match, fighters bleed and show visible signs of their injuries.

Characters
The game features 29 playable characters, including real-life hip hop artists signed to Def Jam at the time, as well as original characters. Funkmaster Flex, Russell Simmons, Kevin Liles, Mayra Verónica, Christine Dolce and Melyssa Ford appear as non playable characters.

"Build a Label"
The game's story mode, called "Build a Label", starts when the player is obligated to create his own "suspect" on an FBI computer. The player can edit every aspect of the character's body and choose his fighting style and fighting song. However, the songs that the players have an option to pick are "Got It Sewed Up (Remix)" by Mike Jones, "Back Then" also by Mike Jones, "Soul Survivor" by Young Jeezy featuring Akon, "I Do This", also by Young Jeezy, "Go Hard Or Go Home" by E-40, "Tell Me When to Go" also by E-40 featuring Keak da Sneak, "Sittin' Sidewayz" by Paul Wall featuring Big Pokey, and "Trill" by Paul Wall featuring Bun B and B.G., along with all fighting styles except Ghetto Blaster and Street Kwon Do, are locked. It is noted that the artists of the 4 songs initially offered are not accessible to sign while the other artists of the other songs are accessible to sign.

After creating a character, the story starts in a sequence where DJ Funkmaster Flex can be heard speaking to his audience on the radio with the instrumental of "I Do This" by Young Jeezy playing in the background. The camera pans through several sections of a neighborhood, including a building with a promotional poster for T.I. vs T.I.P. on the side. By the time Funkmaster Flex is done talking, the camera shows a child, Kevin, walking down the street with his friend Jake while bouncing a basketball. Kevin then spots Curtis Carver (Kevin Liles), a mogul in the music industry, speaking with his record label's vice president (Playa). The camera then shifts to Carver, who is still speaking with Playa, when is suddenly interrupted by Kevin, accompanied by Jake. Kevin then asks Carver for his autograph. While Carver signs Kevin's basketball, he asks the children whether they're staying out of trouble. After handing Kevin back his basketball, Carver also gives him and Jake some money and advises them to pursue careers in basketball, adding that it will bring them financial success. While Kevin and Jake walk away, gunshots are heard and Carver can be seen falling to the ground. Kevin and Jake run away, and Playa can be seen looking at Carver while his blood spreads around his torso on the ground.

Reception

While the game received mixed to positive reviews from critics and game critics, the game received "average" reviews on both platforms according to video game review aggregator Metacritic.

IGN praised the uncensored soundtrack, "beautifully rendered" visuals and the "My Soundtrack" feature on the former version, but criticized "weak fighting moves" and "inconsistent game mechanics". GameSpot, however, became more positive, stating that it "plays well enough, but it really shines thanks to its crazy story and healthy roster."

Detroit Free Press gave the game three stars out of four and said it was "just two hairs short of a masterpiece. EA and Def Jam have set the bar really high for fighting games." The New York Times gave it an average review and stated that "While Icon is the best looking of the Def Jam games, the combat system isn't quite as entertaining, dropping the previous games' over-the-top wrestling moves for more straightforward street fighting. It's not a bad system, but it's just not as wild and entertaining." The A.V. Club gave it a B− and said that "Even if you don't own every Ludacris album, watching the rich environments rattle to the music is reason enough to give this a play. Just don't expect much depth from this beat 'em up."

References

External links
 Official website
 

2007 video games
Def Jam video games
Electronic Arts games
Music generated games
Video games based on musicians
Organized crime video games
PlayStation 3 games
Fighting games
Video game sequels
Video games with custom soundtrack support
Xbox 360 games
Multiplayer and single-player video games
Video games using Havok
Video games developed in the United States